Petersianthus is a genus of woody plant in the Lecythidaceae family first described as a genus in 1865 under the name Petersia. This turned out to be an illegitimate homonym, meaning that it had already been used by someone else to refer to a very different plant. So the name of these species in the Lecythidaceae was changed to Petersianthus. It is native to the Philippines and to parts of Africa. The following two species belong to this genus, with the basionyms of both taxa belonging to what is known today as the family Combretaceae.

species
   (syn. Combretum macrocarpum ) - Guinea, Ivory Coast, Cameroon, Congo Republic, Democratic Republic of the Congo, Cabinda, Gabon, Angola
 Petersianthus quadrialatus  (syn. Terminalia quadrialata ) - Philippines

References

Lecythidaceae
Ericales genera
Taxa named by Elmer Drew Merrill